Ashland is a city in Boone County, Missouri, United States. Ashland is part of the Columbia, Missouri Metropolitan Statistical Area. The population was 4,747 at the 2020 census.

History
Ashland was founded in 1853. It was named for the Ashland estate of Kentucky Congressman Henry Clay in Lexington, Kentucky. Clay was instrumental in the Missouri Compromise of 1820, which allowed Missouri's admission as the 24th state.

Geography
Ashland is located at  (38.773394, -92.257856).

Demographics

2010 census
As of the census of 2010, there were 3,707 people, 1,428 households, and 990 families living in the city. The racial makeup of the city was 96.7% White, 0.8% African American, 0.3% Native American, 0.5% Asian, 0.4% from other races, and 1.3% from two or more races. Hispanic or Latino of any race were 1.5% of the population.

There were 1,428 households, of which 42.4% had children under the age of 18 living with them, 51.4% were married couples living together, 13.8% had a female householder with no husband present, 4.1% had a male householder with no wife present, and 30.7% were non-families. 25.8% of all households were made up of individuals, and 10.1% had someone living alone who was 65 years of age or older. The average household size was 2.54 and the average family size was 3.07.

The median age in the city was 33.9 years. 29.4% of residents were under the age of 18; 6.1% were between the ages of 18 and 24; 31.4% were from 25 to 44; 22% were from 45 to 64; and 11.3% were 65 years of age or older. The gender makeup of the city was 47.0% male and 53.0% female.

2000 census
At the 2000 census, there were 1,869 people, 748 households and 495 families living in the city. The population density was 2,106.7 per square mile (810.8/km). There were 820 housing units at an average density of 924.3 per square mile (355.7/km). The racial makeup of the city was 97.27% White, 0.43% African American, 0.43% Native American, 0.43% Asian, 0.80% from other races, and 0.64% from two or more races. Hispanic or Latino of any race were 1.34% of the population.

There were 748 households, of which 37.4% had children under the age of 18 living with them, 46.4% were married couples living together, 17.4% had a female householder with no husband present, and 33.7% were non-families. 27.0% of all households were made up of individuals, and 10.2% had someone living alone who was 65 years of age or older. The average household size was 2.37 and the average family size was 2.87.

27.2% of the population were under the age of 18, 8.3% from 18 to 24, 32.7% from 25 to 44, 16.3% from 45 to 64, and 15.5% who were 65 years of age or older. The median age was 33 years. For every 100 females, there were 82.5 males. For every 100 females age 18 and over, there were 79.8 males.

The median household income was $34,750 and the median family income was $41,136. Males had a median income of $28,203 versus $24,180 for females. The per capita income for the city was $15,938. About 8.9% of families and 10.3% of the population were below the poverty line, including 14.9% of those under age 18 and 9.4% of those age 65 or over.

Education
Ashland is served by the Southern Boone County R-1 Public School District. The district's schools include:
 Southern Boone High School (Grades 9 through 12)
 Southern Boone County Middle School (Grades 6 through 8)
 Southern Boone County Elementary School (Grades 3 through 5)
 Southern Boone County Primary School (Pre-School through Second Grade and Parents As Teachers)

Southern Boone County R-1 Public School District enrollment doubled between 1991 and 2017.

Ashland has a public library, a branch of the Daniel Boone Regional Library.

Notable people
Eva Johnston, academic at the University of Missouri

References

External links
 City of Ashland Official site
 Daniel Boone Regional Library - Southern Boone County Public Library
 Southern Boone County R-1 School District
 Boone County Journal, local newspaper
 Historic Sanborn Map of Ashland (1922) from University of Missouri Digital Library

 
Cities in Boone County, Missouri
Cities in Columbia metropolitan area (Missouri)
Columbia metropolitan area (Missouri)
Cities in Missouri
1853 establishments in Missouri